The 1947 Philadelphia Eagles season was their 15th in the league. The team improved on their previous output of 6–5, winning eight games. The team qualified for the playoffs for the first time in fifteen seasons.

Off season
The Eagles for the 2nd year went to Saranac Lake High School Field / Eagles Residence, in Saranac Lake, New York to hold training camp. Greasy Neale liked having the Eagles train away from Philadelphia and they only trained near their homebase when there were wartime travel restrictions during WW II. Under Neale the Eagles trained in Wisconsin, upstate New York and Minnesota when they could travel.

NFL Draft
The 1947 NFL Draft was December 16, 1946. The NFL started a lottery of a bonus pick for the first pick in the draft. They did this until 1958.

The Eagles made 29 selections over the 32 rounds. They got the 6th or 7th pick in the rounds in which they had picks.
 
The top two picks in the draft was a lottery bonus pick as the number-one pick by the NFL champion Chicago Bears was Bob Fenimore, a back who attended Oklahoma A&M. 
With the number-two pick the Detroit Lions took 1946 Heisman Trophy winner Glenn Davis a halfback from Army. He was unable to play due to his required military service.
Cal Rossi, a running back from UCLA was drafted again this year with the 4th pick by the Washington Redskins. He was taken in error with the 9th pick in the 1946 draft when he was still a junior in college. He declined to play pro football.

The future NFL Hall of Famers that were in this draft where Dante Lavelli (12th round), Art Donovan (22nd round) and Tom Landry (20th round).

Some players drafted were signed by All-America Football Conference teams.

Draft
The table shows the Eagles selections and what picks they had that were traded away and the team that ended up with that pick. It is possible the Eagles' pick ended up with this team via another team that the Eagles made a trade with. 
Not shown are acquired picks that the Eagles traded away.

Schedule

Playoffs

Roster
(All time List of Philadelphia Eagles players in franchise history)

 
 Link to all time List of Philadelphia Eagles players in franchise history

Standings

Notes

Philadelphia Eagles seasons
Philadelphia Eagles
Philadelphia